Spider has been the name of a number of vessels of the British Royal Navy;

 , formerly the privateer Victoire built at Dunkirk earlier that year, that the Royal Navy captured in 1782, took into service, and sold at Malta in 1806.
 , formerly Vigilante, a Spanish brig-rigged sloop captured on 4 April 1806 by HMS Renommee, and that served in the Royal Navy for the remainder of the Napoleonic Wars. She was broken up in 1815 at Antigua.
 , a six-gun schooner built at Chatham in 1835 to a design by Sir Robert Seppings, which served in South America before becoming an engine fitters' vessel at Plymouth in 1855. Dimensions: Length Overall: 80' 2" x Breadth: 23' 3" x Depth: 9' 10"
 , a wooden gunboat built on the Tyne by T W Smith in 1856, which later served in South America and South Africa. Dimensions: Length Overall: 106' x Breadth: 22' x Depth: 8' 
 , a steel, twin-screw torpedo gunboat built at Devonport in 1887. Of 525 tons displacement, she was armed with one 4" gun and six 3-pounder Quick-firing guns. She had two fixed torpedo tubes and two launching cradles.
 HMS Spider, a coastal destroyer renamed  in 1906.
 Spider, a stern-wheeled gunboat launched by Thornycroft in 1909 that in 1912 served the South Nigerian government.  
 Spider, formerly the wooden fishing boat Francisco Antonio Quarto, purchased at Gibraltar in 1941 and used as a degaussing vessel.

See also 
At least two hired armed vessels also bore the name Spider:
 Hired armed lugger 
 Hired armed cutter

Citations

References
 Demerliac, Alain (1996) La Marine De Louis XVI: Nomenclature Des Navires Français De 1774 À 1792. (Nice: Éditions OMEGA). 
 
 

Royal Navy ship names